Patrick Alexander Hubertus Count of Faber-Castell also Patrick Graf von Faber-Castell (born 4 June 1965) is a German businessman and socialite.

Career
Faber-Castell began a career with Grey Global Group after studying economics. He was from 1993 to 1998 the youngest managing director in Germany and later, as corporate CEO, in London. From London he founded further subsidiaries for Grey Global Group, which dealt with the production of films and videos. In the hot phase of the New Economy, Faber-Castell founded the film and media company Zenturio Group.
In 2002, Zenturio Group was sold to a joint venture of Zeiss and Schneider AG. After the sale of Zenturio he was a partner in the agency von Mannstein, which amongst others, supervised the political communication and campaigning for the election campaign of the FDP in 2006. In 2007, he left the advertising industry. He works for the Faber-Castell international family offices alongside his elder sister. The duo has been one of the first investors in the company founded by Thomas Haffa, EM.TV AG.

In 2014, he returned to the advertising industry and advised the moving image agency Atkon. As an investor and managing director at Mediakraft Networks, he spent a year developing the system of the branded channel. 
At Henkel Group, Faber-Castell has the honorary post as Company Mentor. Further, he is a board member of industry advisors for the company Yext.
Faber-Castell also hit the headlines as real estate investor and acquirer of the German porcelain producer, Rosenthal.
In 2016, Faber-Castell founded TACSY GmbH, which is Europe's first mover of Flagship Channels.

Family 
He is the son of the German industrialist heir and Chinese honorary citizen Hubertus Faber-Castell and Liselotte Faber-Castell. His father was son to Faber-Castell AG sole owner,  and Alix-May of Frankenberg and Ludwigsdorf, who belonged to the owning family of Europe's largest private bank, Sal.Oppenheim Jr & Cie. The company stakes, as well as his involvement in China, made Hubertus Count von Faber-Castell, a billionaire. Faber-Castell has two sisters. The older sister is German-Swiss Caroline Gotzens. Floria, is married to the head of the House of Hesse. According to German wealth reports, Count Patrick has an estimated net worth of 500 million Euros.

On 12 December 2006, he married the German actress Mariella Ahrens in New York City. The couple had previously met at the wedding of Franjo and Verona Pooth in Vienna in September 2005 and had been engaged since September 2006. The church wedding took place on 7 July 2007 in the Faber-Castell Castle in Stein near Nuremberg. The couple has a daughter.

Concern 
In 2015, Patrick was involved in a scandal related with the 2006 FIFA World Cup organization. This situation earned him much negative media attention, as his business partner Robert Louis-Dreyfus allegedly abused the company for bribes to FIFA officials. In 2011, Infront was sold to private equity firm Bridgepoint by the consortium of shareholders for approximately 600 million euros.

Collection
Alongside his mother and siblings, Faber-Castell owns one of the most important collections of silver and jewelry in Germany. Most of the pieces are available to the public in various German museums. The private collection has been recorded by the Kunstmuseum Köln and has been published under the name "Ein Rheinischer Silber Schatz – Schmuck und Geraet aus Privatbesitz".

References 

Living people
German chief executives
German company founders
20th-century German businesspeople
21st-century German businesspeople
German people of Jewish descent
1965 births